, son of Konoe Iehiro and adopted son of Takatsukasa Kanehiro, was a kugyō or Japanese court noble of the Edo period (1603–1868). He did not hold regent positions sesshō and kampaku. He and his wife did not have a son, but they adopted one Hisasuke.

Family 
Parents
Adopted Father: Takatsukasa Kanehiro (鷹司 兼熙, January 17, 1659 – December 24, 1725)
Father: Konoe Iehiro (近衛 家熈, July 24, 1667 – November 5, 1736)
Mother: Machiriji Ryōshi (町尻量子), daughter of Machiriji Kenryō (町尻兼量)
Consorts and issues: 
Wife: Unknown
Adopted children
Takatsukasa Hisasuke (鷹司 尚輔, 1726 – April 19, 1733), son of Konoe Iehiro
Takatsukasa Mototeru (鷹司 基輝, April 19, 1727 – July 6, 1743), son of Ichijō Kaneka

References
 

1710 births
1730 deaths
Fujiwara clan
Takatsukasa family